Gorzupia may refer to the following places in Poland:
Gorzupia, Greater Poland Voivodeship (west-central Poland)
Gorzupia, Lubusz Voivodeship (western Poland)